Masin may refer to:

Places
Kampong Masin, a Bruneian village
Masin (island), an island in the Philippines
Masin, Iran, an Iranian village
Masin District, a Peruvian administrative subdivision
Masin, Peru, the capital of Masin District

Other 

Mašín, Czech surname